Frog coffins are burials of frogs in miniature coffins in Finland for the purposes of folk magic. These coffins are known from finds secreted in churches, as well as from references to their use in folk magic at other locations.

Overview

Churches where such coffins were found include Kuopio Cathedral (about 32 coffins); Tuusniemi Church (about 100 coffins); Kiihtelysvaara Church (4 coffins); Pielavesi Old Church (coffin and bound frogs); coffins and bound frogs have also been found at Nilsiä Old Church; Heinävesi Old Church; Turku Cathedral; and  Church (in Sweden) – along with the coffins other finds included puppets made of alder or birch bark, parts of fishing nets, and textiles.

Physical finds
One such find were the coffins found during restoration work in the choir of Kuopio Cathedral, recorded in the newspaper  in 1895 – the cathedral itself was consecrated in 1816 – according to the report in Savo-Karjala the 'coffins' had been pushed into the space through ventilation hatches. At the time of discovery some of the coffins were relatively new. Five further coffins were found in 1901, and the find recorded in Savo-Karjala again – the newspaper surmised from the number that the coffins were being added yearly. Two coffins were kept by the National Museum of Finland in Helsinki, and another in the Kuopio Museum – features of these offerings were – a coffin carved from alder wood; a frog inside the coffin; fishing net covering or wrapping the frog; a needle impaling the frog with white thread in the needle; in one case it is thought the frog's mouth had been stitched shut.

Finds with very similar features were found in 1907 at the church in Tuusniemi (b.1869). At the same church similar coffins were found in 1818 in the church's bell tower- these coffins also contained bedbugs, animal hair, or grains. Another find was made in the 1930s under the churches stone foundation.

Possibly related finds include a cat in an alder coffin at Kiihtelysvaara Church, and alder coffins (about ) containing a carved human figure found at The Old Church of Pielavesi.

Whilst most coffins have been found in eastern Finland an example has been found in the west at Turku Cathedral – this deposit was a 'high quality' work was made of varnished pine with cloth, and the initials 'HM' on the base. Radiocarbon dating, building history, and style have dated this coffin to the late 17th century or early 18th century.

Folklore
There is extensive recorded folklore concerning the placement of frogs in coffins in eastern Finland, including central Finland, Savo, Karelia, North Ostrobothnia, Kainuu, and as far north as south Lapland – these areas are mostly Lutheran in modern religion, except Karelia which is Orthodox.

Generally the burial of a miniature coffin is a key part of the ritual. The majority of recorded lore is about counter-magic – intended to reflect evil intentions back to the those sending them. A lesser part of recorded rituals are malicious in intent – the ritual may be similar to the counter-magic one, but include the burial of an item from the victim in the coffin, though the intent of ritual is also key. In these rituals frogs are the commonest animal (about 70%) though others may be used including squirrels, pike, or even a human foetus. Animal substances (milk, feathers, hooves etc.) may have also been buried in a miniature coffin.

In recorded folklore accounts it was thought that such a practise was powerful magic, and could kill an intended victim. Other spells or rituals could be healing, such as a cure for epilepsy which included burying a piece of the afflicted's undergarments with a frog coffin – this cure likely was another form of a protective 'reflective' spell, with the illness assumed caused by malicious sorcery. For example, in a ritual to dispel the problem of cows not returning home at night, recorded from the cunning man Mikko Koljonen (born 1812) of Viitasaari:

A ritual against epilepsy also use a 'frog coffin' – it gives one ritual by which such coffins might end deposited in churches :

Christian interpretations and influence

Both the malicious intent of 'frog coffin' rituals, and also those intended to 'reflect' evil intent back on the sender were at odds with the Christian world view of forgiveness, though the protective use against other persons' malice could co-exist to some extent as it did not harm the innocent. Contemporary newspaper reports of finds of such burials were scathing of such practises occurring and continuing to occur.  notes the use of Christian holy places as geographic focuses for non-Christian practices. It is thought that the Väki ('Power') for these spells may have come from the dead associated with the church and churchyard. In some cases miniature coffin rituals included elements of Christian practice, such as reciting parts of the Lord's Prayer, but not performed by a priest.

In other cultures
The Zhuang people of China idolize the frog – on the first day of the Lunar Year a societal ritual ("Yaogui") takes place including a hunt for hibernating frogs ("Gui"), and their sacrifice and placing in a coffin (of a Bamboo section). On the 25th day after the sacrifice, the frog's bones are exhumed and used to foretell the next harvest.

See also

Apotropaic magic
Church grim
Concealed shoes
Dried cat
Horse skulls
Witch bottle

References

Notes

Sources

Further reading

Magic items
Finnish folklore
Amphibians in culture
Frogs
Coffins